Help, My Bride Steals is a 1964 Austrian-West German comedy film directed by Werner Jacobs and starring Peter Alexander, Cornelia Froboess and Gunther Philipp. A man marries a woman soon after meeting her, unaware that she is a kleptomaniac.

Cast
 Peter Alexander as Valentin Haase
 Cornelia Froboess as Elisabeth Schöner
 Gunther Philipp as Gustav Notnagel
 Elfriede Irrall as Tessy
 Fred Liewehr as Generaldirektor Schöner, Elisabeths Vater
 Guggi Löwinger as Champagnermizzi
 Kurt Heintel as Direktor Bensberg
 Rudolf Carl as Ober Franz
 Guido Wieland as Ein Herr
 Peter Gerhard as Juwelier
 Raoul Retzer as Wirt
 Elisabeth Stiepl as Ältere Dame
 Rudolf Vogel as Psychotherapeut

External links

1964 films
1964 musical comedy films
German musical comedy films
Austrian musical comedy films
West German films
1960s German-language films
Films directed by Werner Jacobs
Gloria Film films
1960s German films